Michal Horský (1 July 1943, Trnava – 18 March 2018) was a Slovak political scientist and politician. A member of the Public Against Violence, he was elected to the Chamber of the Nations, the upper chamber of the Federal Assembly of Czechoslovakia, between 1990 and 1992.

References

1943 births
2018 deaths
Politicians from Trnava
Public Against Violence politicians
Civic Democratic Union (Slovakia) politicians
Members of the Chamber of the Nations of Czechoslovakia (1990–1992)
Slovak political scientists